Frederickson Fieldhouse was an athletics facility on the campus of Oklahoma City University in Oklahoma City, Oklahoma. It was built in honor of a major OCU benefactor, George Frederickson, of Oklahoma City. It was built by the John Henry Frederickson, Jr. Construction company, also of Oklahoma City. John Frederickson was the General Contractor, and his son, Chris Frederickson, also worked on the job as a laborer. George Frederickson was the uncle of John Henry Frederickson, Jr.. In his gift to OCU,  George  stipulated that the building should be built by his nephew, John Henry.

Frederickson Field House  facility was at the time of its construction (1959) the largest hyperbolic paraboloid structure on earth. The Frederickson construction company was in fact a pioneering company in the design and building of extremely thin-shell concrete buildings, of which Frederickson Field House was one. Another famous thin-shell concrete structure built by John Henry Frederickson was the First Christian Church, also in Oklahoma City. That building has an "eggshell" shaped roof that is actually thinner (in proportion) that a real eggshell.
The Frederickson Field house venue held 3,400 for basketball. Asked why the scoreboard at the Field House was the first one to have a three digit placement for the team scores, Abe Lemons, the coach at the time, said come to the first game and you will find out.  Teams rarely scored in the 100s at the time (late 1950s) but in the first game at the Field House OCU beat Florida State Univ by scoring 129 points in the game. The Chiefs (now the STARS, due to the OCU administration's caving in to political correctness) were to be one on the highest scoring teams in the country, scoring over 100 points a game on many occasions.  A Division I team the OCU teams were an Independent team until joining the Midwestern City Conference, now known as the Horizon League. OCU dropped to NAIA status in 1985. It was replaced with the more modern Henry J. Freede Wellness and Activities Center in 2000, and torn down in 2005.

NBA great Willis Reed of the New York Knicks called the "floor" at Frederickson Field House as the best floor in the country, as it had the most spring in it that he had ever played on. 

Oklahoma City Stars men's basketball
College basketball venues in the United States
Basketball venues in Oklahoma
Indoor arenas in Oklahoma
Sports venues completed in 1959
1959 establishments in Oklahoma
Sports venues demolished in 2005
2005 disestablishments in Oklahoma